Berlina may refer to:

Sedan (automobile), a style of passenger car
Alfa Romeo 1750 Berlina, an automobile produced from 1968 to 1977
Holden Berlina, an automobile produced by the Holden subsidiary of General Motors since 1984
Opel Rekord Berlina, a specification level of the Opel Rekord automobile produced by the Opel subsidiary of General Motors
Phillips Berlina, a neo-classic car produced from 1980 to 1983